The Golden Helmet Award is awarded annually to best six players of the Kontinental Hockey League (KHL): 1 goaltender, 2 defenders and 3 forwards.

Winners
Key

References

Kontinental Hockey League trophies and awards